Chelinidea is a genus of Cactus bugs in the family Coreidae, the sole genus of the tribe Chelinideini. There are five described species in Chelinidea, found in Central and North America. Three of these species have been introduced into Australia.

Species
These five species belong to the genus Chelinidea:
 Chelinidea canyona Hamlin, 1923  (North and Central America, Australia)
 Chelinidea hunteri Hamlin, 1923  (North and Central America)
 Chelinidea staffilesi Herring, 1980  (Central America)
 Chelinidea tabulata (Burmeister, 1835) (prickly pear bug)  (North, Central, and South America, Australia)
 Chelinidea vittiger Uhler, 1863 (cactus coreid)  (North and Central America, Australia)

References

Further reading

External links

 

Coreidae genera
Chelinideini